The following is the complete list of the WiiWare titles available for the Wii in the PAL region as shown within the WiiWare section of the Wii Shop Channel. There are currently 281 games in Europe and 209 games in Australia. New games were added weekly on Fridays until June 2011, when uploads were moved to Thursdays.

It was announced on September 29, 2017 that Nintendo planned to discontinue the Wii Shop Channel by January 31, 2019, with the purchase of Wii Points for new games ended on March 26, 2018.

Available titles

{| class="wikitable sortable" style="width:90%"
!width="45%"|Title and Source
!width="25%"|Developer(s)
!width="10%"|Wii Points
!width="20%"|Release Date
|-
|"Aha! I Found It!" Hidden Object Game
|Ateam Inc.
|500
|
|-
|"Aha! I Got It!" Escape Game
|Ateam Inc.
|500
|
|-
|101-in-1 Explosive Megamix (not available in Australia)
|Nordcurrent
|700
|
|-
|2 Fast 4 Gnomz
|QubicGames
|500
|
|-
|3-2-1, Rattle Battle!
|Tecmo
|500
|
|-
|3D Pixel Racing (not available in Australia)
|Microforum Ltd.
|500
|
|-
|5 Arcade Gems (not available in Australia)
|Nordcurrent
|700
|
|-
|5 Spots Party
|Cosmonaut Games
|500
|
|-
|530 Eco Shooter
|Nintendo, Intelligent Systems
|1000
|
|-
|A Monsteca Corral: Monsters vs. Robots
|Onteca
|500
|
|-
|Actionloop Twist
|Mitchell Corporation, Nintendo
|1000
|
|-
|Adventure Island: The Beginning
|Hudson Soft
|1000
|
|-
|Adventure on Lost Island: Hidden Object Game
|Ateam Inc.
|500
|
|-
|Airport Mania: First Flight
|Reflexive Entertainment, Lemon Games
|500
|
|-
|Alien Crush Returns
|Hudson Soft
|800
|
|-
|And Yet It Moves
|Broken Rules
|1000
|
|-
|ANIMA: Ark of Sinners (not available in Australia)
|Anima Game Studio
|1000
|
|-
|Ant Nation 
|Konami
|700
|
|-
|Arcade Essentials (not available in Australia)
|Nordcurrent
|500
| 
|-
|Arcade Sports: Air Hockey, Bowling, Pool, Snooker
|Icon Games
|800
|
|-
|Arkanoid Plus!
|Taito
|800
|
|-
|Around the World (not available in Australia)
|Wizarbox
|500
|
|-
|Art of Balance (not available in Australia)
|Shin'en Multimedia
|800
|
|-
|Art Style: CUBELLO
|Nintendo, skip Ltd.
|600
|
|-
|Art Style: light trax
|Nintendo, skip Ltd.
|600
|
|-
|Art Style: ORBIENT
|Nintendo, skip Ltd.
|600
|
|-
|Art Style: PENTA TENTACLES
|Nintendo, skip Ltd.
|600
|
|-
|Art Style: ROTOHEX
|Nintendo, skip Ltd.
|600
|
|-
|Aya and the Cubes of Light
|Object Vision Software
|1000
|
|-
|Babel Rising
|Lexis Numérique
|500
|
|-
|Back to Nature (not available in Australia)
|UFA Lab
|500
|
|-
|Bang Attack
|Engine Software
|600
|
|-
|Beer Pong: Frat Party Games (not available in Australia)
|JV Games
|800
|
|-
|Bejeweled 2 (not available in Australia)
|PopCap Games
|1000
|
|-
|Ben 10 Alien Force: The Rise of Hex 
|Konami
|1000
|
|-
|Big Town Shoot Out (not available in Australia)
|Performance Design Products
|500
|
|-
|Bingo Party Deluxe
|Ateam Inc.
|500
|
|-
|Bit Boy!! (not available in Australia)
|Bplus
|600
|
|-
|Bit.Trip Beat
|Gaijin Games
|600
|
|-
|Bit.Trip Core
|Gaijin Games
|600
|
|-
|Bit.Trip Fate
|Gaijin Games
|800
|
|-
|Bit.Trip Flux
|Gaijin Games
|800
| 
|-
|Bit.Trip Runner
|Gaijin Games
|800
|
|-
|Bit.Trip Void
|Gaijin Games
|600
|
|-
|Blaster Master: Overdrive 
|Sunsoft, Gamebridge
|1000
|
|-
|Block Breaker Deluxe
|Gameloft
|800
|
|-
|Blood Beach
|Coresoft Inc.
|500
|
|-
|Bloons (not available in Australia)
|Hands-On Mobile
|500
|
|-
|Bobby Carrot Forever (not available in Australia)
|FDG Entertainment
|800
|
|-
|Bomberman Blast
|Hudson Soft
|1000
|
|-
|Bonsai Barber
|Zoonami
|1000
|
|-
|Brain Cadets
|Rising Star Games
|1000
|
|-
|Brain Challenge
|Gameloft
|1000
|
|-
|Brain Drain (not available in Australia)
|Enjoy Gaming
|500
|
|-
|Bubble Bobble Plus!
|Taito
|800
|
|-
|BurgerTime World Tour
|Frozen Codebase, MonkeyPaw Games
|1000
|
|-
|Castlevania: The Adventure ReBirth
|Konami
|1000
|
|-
|Cave Story
|Nicalis
|1000
|
|-
|Chess Challenge! 
|Digital Leisure
|500
|
|-
|chick chick BOOM
|ton of bits
|800
|
|-
|Chronos Twins DX (not available in Australia)
|EnjoyUp Games
|700
|
|-
|Cocoto Fishing Master
|Neko Entertainment
|700
|
|-
|Cocoto Platform Jumper
|Neko Entertainment
|700
|
|-
|ColorZ (not available in Australia)
|Exkee
|700
|
|-
|Contra ReBirth (not available in Australia)
|Konami
|1000
|
|-
|Copter Crisis
|Digital Leisure
|500
|
|-
|Cosy Fire (not available in Australia)
|dtp young entertainment
|500
|
|-
|Cricket Challenge (not available in Australia)
|Gameshastra
|500
|
|-
|Critter Round-Up
|Epicenter Studios, Konami
|1000
|
|-
|Cruise Party (not available in Australia)
|Enjoy Gaming
|800
|
|-
|Crystal Defenders R1
|Square Enix
|800
|
|-
|Crystal Defenders R2
|Square Enix
|800
|
|-
|Cue Sports: Snooker vs Billiards
|Hudson Soft
|800
|
|-
|Deer Drive Legends (not available in Australia)
|Maximum Games
|500
|
|-
|Defend Your Castle
|XGen Studios
|500
|
|-
|Diner Dash (delisted in 2011)
|Hudson Soft
|1000
|
|-
|Dive: The Medes Islands Secret
|Cosmonaut Games
|1000
|
|-
|Dr. Mario & Germ Buster
|Arika, Nintendo
|1000
|
|-
|Dracula: Undead Awakening
|Chillingo
|1000
|
|-
|Dragon Master Spell Caster
|Stickmen Studios
|500
|
|-
|Driift Mania
|Konami
|800
|
|-
|Eat! Fat! FIGHT!
|Tecmo
|1000
|
|-
|Enjoy your massage! (not available in Australia)
|Microforum Ltd.
|500
|
|-
|Equilibrio
|DK Games
|500
|
|-
|escapeVektor: Chapter 1
|Nnooo
|500
|
|-
|Excitebike: World Challenge
|Nintendo
|1000
|
|-
|Family & Friends Party
|Gammick Entertainment
|1000
|
|-
|Family Card Games
|Arc System Works
|500
|
|-
|Family Games: Pen & Paper Edition (not available in Australia)
|Icon Games
|500
|
|-
|Family Glide Hockey
|Arc System Works
|500
|
|-
|Family Mini Golf
|Arc System Works
|500
||
|-
|Family Pirate Party
|Arc System Works
|500
|
|-
|Family Slot Car Racing
|Arc System Works
|500
|
|-
|Family Table Tennis
|Arc System Works
|800
|
|-
|FAST Racing League
|Shin'en Multimedia
|1000
|
|-
|Fast Draw Showdown
|Digital Leisure
|500
|
|-
|Fenimore Fillmore "The Westerner" (not available in Australia)
|Revistronic
|1000
|
|-
|Final Fantasy Crystal Chronicles: My Life as a Darklord
|Square Enix
|1000
|
|-
|Final Fantasy Crystal Chronicles: My Life as a King
|Square Enix
|1500
|
|-
|Final Fantasy IV: The After Years
|Square Enix
|800
|
|-
|Fish Tank (not available in Australia)
|iFun4All
|500
|
|-
|Fish'em All
|Abylight
|800
|
|-
|Fishie Fishie (not available in Australia)
|DK Games
|500
|
|-
|Flight Control
|Firemint
|500
|
|-
|Flowerworks: Follie's Adventure
|Nocturnal Entertainment
|500
|
|-
|Football Up! (not available in Australia)
|EnjoyUp Games
|500
|
|-
|Frogger Returns
|Konami
|500
|
|-
|Frogger: Hyper Arcade Edition
|Konami
|1000
|
|-
|Fun! Fun! Minigolf
|Shin'en Multimedia
|900
|
|-
|Furry Legends
|Gamelion Studios
|1000
|
|-
|Gabrielle's Ghostly Groove: Monster Mix
|Natsume
|500
|
|-
|Ghost Mania (not available in Australia)
|Legendo Entertainment
|500
|
|-
|Ghost Mansion Party
|Gameloft
|1000
|
|-
|Girlfriends Forever: Magic Skate (not available in Australia)
|Kolkom
|800
|
|-
|Gnomz
|QubicGames
|500
|
|-
|Gods vs. Humans (delisted in 2011)
|Artefacts Studio
|1500
|
|-
|Gradius ReBirth
|Konami
|600
|
|-
|Happy Hammerin' (not available in Australia)
|Gamebridge
|500
|
|-
|Happy Holidays: Christmas
|505 Games
|500
|
|-
|Happy Holidays: Halloween
|505 Games
|500
|
|-
|Heavy Fire: Special Operations (not available in Australia)
|Teyon
|500
|
|-
|Helix
|Ghostfire Games
|1000
|
|-
|Heracles Chariot Racing
|Neko Entertainment
|800
|
|-
|Heron: Steam Machine (not available in Australia)
|Triangle Studios
|500
|
|-
|Home Sweet Home
|Big Blue Bubble
|1000
|
|-
|HoopWorld: BasketBrawl
|Streamline Studios, Virtual Toys
|1000
|
|-
|Horizon Riders (not available in Australia)
|Sabarasa
|800
|
|-
|Hydroventure
|Nintendo, Curve Digital
|1200
|
|-
|Jam City Rollergirls
|Frozen Codebase
|500
|
|-
|Jett Rocket
|Shin'en Multimedia
|1000
|
|-
|Jewel Keepers: Easter Island (not available in Australia)
|Nordcurrent
|500
|
|-
|Jungle Speed
|Next Level Games, Nintendo
|1000
|
|-
|Karate Phants: Gloves of Glory (delisted on June 30, 2012)
|Snap Dragon
|800
|
|-
|Kung Fu Funk: Everybody is Kung Fu Fighting!
|Stickmen Studios
|500
|
|-
|Kyotokei (not available in Australia)
|Microforum Ltd.
|500
|
|-
|La-Mulana
|Nigoro, EnjoyUp Games
|1000
|
|-
|Lead the Meerkats (not available in Australia)
|Inaria Interactive
|1000
|
|-
|Learning with The PooYoos: Episode 1
|Lexis Numérique
|500
|
|-
|Learning with The PooYoos: Episode 2
|Lexis Numérique
|500
|
|-
|Learning with The PooYoos: Episode 3
|Lexis Numérique
|500
|
|-
|Let's Catch
|Prope, Sega
|1000
|
|-
|lilt line (not available in Australia)
|Gaijin Games
|500
|
|-
|LIT
|WayForward Technologies
|800
|
|-
|Little Tournament Over Yonder (not available in Australia)
|Gevo Entertainment
|800
|
|-
|Lonpos (delisted in 2011)
|Genki
|800
|
|-
|LostWinds
|Frontier Developments
|1000
|
|-
|LostWinds 2: Winter of the Melodias
|Frontier Developments
|1000
| (EU) (AU)
|-
|MaBoShi: The Three Shape Arcade
|Mindware Corp, Nintendo
|800
|
|-
|Magic Destiny: Astrological Games (not available in Australia)
|Shanblue Interactive
|500
|
|-
|Magnetis (not available in Australia)
|Yullaby
|500
|
|-
|Mahjong
|Cosmigo, GameOn
|500
|
|-
|Manic Monkey Mayhem (delisted in 2014)
|The Code Monkeys Ltd.
|1000
|
|-
|Max & the Magic Marker
|Press Play
|1000
|
|-
|Mega Man 9
|Inti Creates, Capcom
|1000
|
|-
|Mega Man 10
|Inti Creates, Capcom
|1000
|
|-
|Midnight Bowling
|Gameloft
|800
|
|-
|Midnight Pool
|Gameloft
|800
|
|-
|miffy's world
|Biodroid, PAN Vision
|1000
|
|-
|Military Madness: Nectaris (delisted on March 31, 2012)
|Hudson Soft, Backbone Entertainment
|1000
|
|-
|Mister Bumblebee Racing Champion
|h2f Informationssysteme
|500
|
|-
|Mix Superstar
|Digital Leisure
|500
|
|-
|Moki Moki
|Natsume
|800
|
|-
|Monochrome Racing (not available in Australia)
|Nordcurrent
|500
|
|-
|MotoHeroz
|RedLynx
|1500
|
|-
|Mr. Driller W
|Bandai Namco
|800
|
|-
|Muscle March
|Bandai Namco
|500
|
|-
|My Aquarium
|Hudson Soft
|500
|
|-
|My Aquarium 2
|Hudson Soft
|500
|
|-
|My Fireplace (not available in Australia)
|Korner Entertainment
|500
|
|-
|My Little Baby
|dtp young entertainment
|600
|
|-
|My Pokémon Ranch
|Ambrella, Nintendo
|1000
|
|-
|My Starry Night
|Hudson Soft
|500
|
|-
|My Zoo
|Hudson Soft
|500
|
|-
|Neves Plus: Pantheon of Tangrams (delisted on June 30, 2012)
|Yuke's, Abylight
|500
|
|-
|Newton vs. The Horde (not available in Australia)
|RadiationBurn
|500
|
|-
|Niki – Rock 'n' Ball (not available in Australia)
|Bplus
|500
|
|-
|NyxQuest: Kindred Spirits
|Over The Top Games
|1000
|
|-
|Onslaught
|Hudson Soft
|1000
|
|-
|Overturn: Mecha Wars
|Studio Zan
|800
|
|-
|Paint Splash (not available in Australia)
|KnapNok Games
|500
|
|-
|Pallurikio
|Playstos
|1000
|
|-
|Paper Wars: Cannon Fodder (not available in Australia)
|iFun4all
|500
|
|-
|Pearl Harbor Trilogy - 1941: Red Sun Rising
|Legendo Entertainment
|700
|
|-
|Penguins & Friends: Hey! That's My Fish! (not available in Australia, delisted on May 15, 2012)
|Gammick Entertainment
|800
|
|-
|Phoenix Wright: Ace Attorney
|Capcom
|1000
|
|-
|Phoenix Wright: Ace Attorney − Justice for All
|Capcom
|1000
|
|-
|Phoenix Wright: Ace Attorney − Trials and Tribulations
|Capcom
|1000
|
|-
|Physio Fun Balance Training (not available in Australia)
|Kaasa Solution
|2000
|
|-
|Physio Fun: Pelvic Floor Training (not available in Australia)
|Kaasa Solution
|1000
|
|-
|PictureBook Games: A Pop-Up Adventure
|Nintendo
|800
|
|-
|Pirates: The Key of Dreams
|Oxygen Games
|1000
|
|-
|Pit Crew Panic!
|Hudson Soft
|500
|
|-
|Plättchen Twist 'n' Paint
|Bplus
|1500
|
|-
|Pokémon Rumble
|Ambrella, Nintendo
|1500
|
|-
|Pop
|Nnooo
|700
|
|-
|Pop Them, Drop Them SameGame
|Hudson Soft
|500
|
|-
|Pop-up Pirate!
|Takara Tomy
|500
|
|-
|Potpourrii: A delicate mixture of challenge and fun!
|Abstraction Games
|800
|
|-
|Protöthea
|Digital Builders, Sabarasa, Ubisoft
|1000
|
|-
|Pub Darts (not available in Australia)
|Big Blue Bubble
|500
|
|-
|Pucca's Kisses Game (not available in Australia)
|Bigben Interactive
|1000
|
|-
|Puzzle Bobble Plus!
|Taito
|800
|
|-
|Rabbids Lab
|Ubisoft
|500
|
|-
|Racers' Islands: Crazy Arenas (delisted in 2011)
|Artefacts Studio, Zallag
|800
|
|-
|Racers' Islands: Crazy Racers (delisted in 2011)
|Artefacts Studio, Zallag
|1200
|
|-
|Rage of the Gladiator (not available in Australia)
|Ghostfire Games
|1000
|
|-
|Rainbow Islands: Towering Adventure!
|Taito
|800
|
|-
|Reel Fishing Challenge
|Marvelous Entertainment, Natsume
|500
|
|-
|Reel Fishing Challenge II
|Marvelous Entertainment, Natsume
|500
|
|-
|Reel Fishing Ocean Challenge
|Marvelous Entertainment, Natsume
|500
|
|-
|Retro City Rampage
|Vblank Entertainment
|1000
|
|-
|Robin Hood: The Return of Richard (not available in Australia)
|Nordcurrent
|500
|
|-
|Robocalypse: Beaver Defense
|Vogster Entertainment
|600
|
|-
|Robox (not available in Australia)
|Dreambox Games
|1000
|
|-
|Rock N’ Roll Climber
|Nintendo
|800
|
|-
|Rubik's Puzzle Galaxy: RUSH
|Two Tribes
|600
|
|-
|Rush Rush Rally Racing
|Senile Team
|900
|
|-
|Sandy Beach 
|Konami
|500
|
|-
|Save the Furries
|SDP Games
|1000
|
|-
|Sexy Poker
|Gameloft
|500
|
|-
|Shootanto: Evolutionary Mayhem (delisted in 2011)
|Grand Prix Games, Hudson Soft
|500
|
|-
|Sneezies
|Chillingo
|500
|
|-
|Snowboard Riot
|Hudson Soft
|1000
|
|-
|Soccer Bashi
|Icon Games
|500
|
|-
|Solitaire
|Cosmigo, GameOn
|500
|
|-
|Sonic the Hedgehog 4: Episode I
|Sega
|1500
|
|-
|Space Invaders Get Even
|Square Enix
|500
|
|-
|Spaceball Revolution
|Virtual Toys
|800
|
|-
|SPOGS Racing (not available in Australia)
|D2C Games
|1000
|
|-
|Spot the Differences! (not available in Australia)
|Sanuk Games
|500
|
|-
|Star Soldier R
|Hudson Soft
|800
|
|-
|Stop Stress: A Day of Fury
|Abylight
|800
|
|-
|Strong Bad's Cool Game for Attractive People - Episode 1: Homestar Ruiner
|Telltale Games
|1000
|
|-
|Strong Bad's Cool Game for Attractive People - Episode 2: Strong Badia the Free
|Telltale Games
|1000
|
|-
|Strong Bad's Cool Game for Attractive People - Episode 3: Baddest of the Bands
|Telltale Games
|1000
|
|-
|Strong Bad's Cool Game for Attractive People - Episode 4: Dangeresque 3: The Criminal Projective
|Telltale Games
|1000
|
|-
|Strong Bad's Cool Game For Attractive People - Episode 5: 8-Bit Is Enough
|Telltale Games
|1000
|
|-
|Stunt Cars
|Icon Games
|800
|
|-
|Successfully Learning English: Year 2 (not available in Australia)
|Tivola
|800
|
|-
|Successfully Learning English: Year 3 (not available in Australia)
|Tivola
|800
|
|-
|Successfully Learning English: Year 4 (not available in Australia)
|Tivola
|800
|
|-
|Successfully Learning English: Year 5 (not available in Australia)
|Tivola
|800
|
|-
|Successfully Learning German: Year 2 (not available in Australia)
|Tivola
|500
|
|-
|Successfully Learning German: Year 3 (not available in Australia)
|Tivola
|500
|
|-
|Successfully Learning German: Year 4 (not available in Australia)
|Tivola
|500
|
|-
|Successfully Learning German: Year 5 (not available in Australia)
|Tivola
|500
|
|-
|Successfully Learning Mathematics: Year 2 (not available in Australia)
|Tivola
|800
|
|-
|Successfully Learning Mathematics: Year 3 (not available in Australia)
|Tivola
|800
|
|-
|Successfully Learning Mathematics: Year 4 (not available in Australia)
|Tivola
|800
|
|-
|Successfully Learning Mathematics: Year 5 (not available in Australia)
|Tivola
|800
|
|-
|Sudoku Challenge!
|Digital Leisure
|500
|
|-
|Swords & Soldiers
|Ronimo Games
|1000
|
|-
|Tales of Elastic Boy: Mission 1
|Lexis Numérique
|600
|
|-
|Tales of Monkey Island - Chapter 1: Launch of the Screaming Narwhal
|Telltale Games
|1000
|
|-
|Tales of Monkey Island - Chapter 2: The Siege of Spinner Cay
|Telltale Games
|1000
|
|-
|Tales of Monkey Island - Chapter 3: Lair of the Leviathan
|Telltale Games
|1000
|
|-
|Tales of Monkey Island - Chapter 4: The Trial and Execution of Guybrush Threepwood
|Telltale Games
|1000
|
|-
|Tales of Monkey Island - Chapter 5: Rise of the Pirate God
|Telltale Games
|1000
|
|-
|Tetris Party
|Hudson Soft
|1200
|
|-
|Texas Hold'em Poker
|Gameloft
|600
|
|-
|Texas Hold'em Tournament
|Digital Leisure
|500
|
|-
|The Incredible Maze
|Digital Leisure
|500
|
|-
|The Mystery of Whiterock Castle
|RTL Playtainment
|700
|
|-
|The Tales of Bearsworth Manor: Chaotic Conflicts
|Square Enix
|1000
|
|-
|The Tales of Bearsworth Manor: Puzzling Pages
|Square Enix
|1000
|
|-
|The Three Musketeers: One for all!
|Legendo Entertainment
|900
|
|-
|The Very Hungry Caterpillar's ABCs (not available in Australia, delisted on November 30, 2012)
|Cybird
|800
|
|-
|The Will of Dr. Frankenstein (not available in Australia)
|Enjoy Gaming
|500
|
|-
|ThruSpace: High Velocity 3D Puzzle
|Keys Factory, Nintendo
|800
|
|-
|TNT Racers
|dtp Entertainment
|1000
|
|-
|Toki Tori
|Two Tribes
|900
|
|-
|Tomena Sanner
|Konami
|500
|
|-
|Toribash: Violence Perfected
|Nabi Studios
|1000
|
|-
|Trenches Generals (not available in Australia)
|Fishing Cactus
|700
|
|-
|TV Show King
|Gameloft
|1000
|
|-
|TV Show King 2 
|Gameloft
|800
|
|-
|Ubongo (not available in Australia)
|Korner Entertainment
|800
|
|-
|UNO
|Gameloft
|500
|
|-
|Urbanix (not available in Australia)
|Nordcurrent
|500
|
|-
|Vampire Crystals
|Shanblue Interactive
|1000
|
|-
|Violin Paradise
|Keystone Game Studio
|500
|
|-
|Viral Survival (not available in Australia)
|Peakvox
|500
|
|-
|Voodoo Dice
|Ubisoft
|1000
|
|-
|WarioWare: Do It Yourself - Showcase
|Nintendo, Intelligent Systems
|800
| (EU) (AU)
|-
|Water Warfare
|Hudson Soft
|800
|
|-
|Where's Wally? Fantastic Journey 1 (delisted on December 31, 2012)
|Ludia
|500
|
|-
|Where's Wally? Fantastic Journey 2 (delisted on December 31, 2012)
|Ludia
|500
|
|-
|Where's Wally? Fantastic Journey 3 (delisted on December 31, 2012)
|Ludia
|500
|
|-
|Wild West Guns
|Gameloft
|1000
|
|-
|Word Searcher
|Digital Leisure
|500
|
|-
|World of Goo
|2D Boy
|1500
|
|-
|Yard Sale Hidden Treasures: Sunnyville
|Konami
|500
|
|-
|You, Me, and the Cubes
|Fyto, Nintendo
|1000
|
|-
|Yummy Yummy Cooking Jam
|Virtual Toys
|1000
|
|-
|Zenquaria: Virtual Aquarium
|Paon, Nintendo
|600
|
|-
|Zombie Panic in Wonderland (not available in Australia)
|Akaoni Studio
|1000
|
|-
|}

See also
 List of WiiWare games
 List of WiiWare games (North America)
 List of Wii games
 Lists of Virtual Console games
 List of Virtual Console games for Wii (PAL region)
 List of DSiWare games and applications
 List of DSiWare games (PAL region)
 List of Nintendo 3DS games
 List of Wii U software

References

External links
 Nintendo of Europe's WiiWare page
 Hudson Soft's WiiWare portal 

WiiWare

fr:Liste de jeux WiiWare
ja:Wiiウェアのゲームタイトル一覧
pt:Anexo:Lista de jogos do WiiWare
zh:WiiWare遊戲列表